Rubina Khalid (1959 – 23 December 2017) was a Pakistani Quran reciter. In 1996, she received Pride of Performance in Qirat.

She died at the age of 58.

Early life
She was born in 1959 and did her master's degree in Arabic from the University of the Punjab in 1987. She had memorized the Qura'n and achieved proficiency in Qirat by the time she was nine years old.

References

1959 births
2017 deaths
University of the Punjab alumni
Recipients of the Pride of Performance
Pakistani Quran reciters